The Ultimate Tour was the nineteenth concert tour by Canadian singer Bryan Adams in support of his sixth compilation album, Ultimate. The tour began in Matakana, New Zealand on 2 January 2018, and is set to conclude in Grand Cayman on 15 February 2019.

Background
On 3 November 2017, Adams released his sixth compilation album, titled Ultimate. On 13 October 2017, Adams announced the European dates, followed by the Oceania tour dates on 31 October 2017.

Set list 
 "One Night Love Affair"
 "Can't Stop This Thing We Started"
 "Run to You"
 "Go Down Rockin'"
 "Heaven"
 "This Time"
 "It's Only Love"
 "Please Stay"
 "Cloud Number Nine"
 "You Belong to Me"
 "Summer of '69"
 "Here I Am"
 "When You're Gone"
 "(Everything I Do) I Do It for You"
 "Back to You"
 "Somebody"
 "Have You Ever Really Loved a Woman?"
 "Brand New Day"
 "18 til I Die"
 "I'm Ready"
 "The Only Thing That Looks Good on Me Is You"
 "Cuts Like a Knife"

Encore
 "Ultimate Love"
 "I Fought the Law"
 "Straight from the Heart"
 "All for Love"

Tour dates

References

2018 concert tours
2019 concert tours
Bryan Adams
Concerts at Malmö Arena